Amir Hayat Hiraj is a Pakistani politician who was a Member of the Provincial Assembly of the Punjab, from May 2013 to May 2018.

Early life and education
He was born on 2 January 1982 in Khanewal.

He graduated  from Bahauddin Zakariya University in 2005.

Political career
He was elected to the Provincial Assembly of the Punjab as a candidate of Pakistan Muslim League (Q) from Constituency PP-216 (Khanewal-V) in 2008 Pakistani general election.
He was Reelected to the Provincial Assembly of the Punjab as a candidate of Pakistan Muslim League (Nawaz) from Constituency PP-216 (Khanewal-V) in 2013 Pakistani general election.

References

Living people
Punjab MPAs 2013–2018
1982 births
Pakistan Muslim League (N) politicians